Juhan Ostrat (also Johannes Ostrat; 5 March 1883 Kudina Parish, Tartu County - 22 February 1957) was an Estonian politician. He was a member of Estonian Constituent Assembly. He was a member of the assembly since 19 December 1919. He replaced Juhan Ainson. On 22 January 1920, he resigned his position and he was replaced by Jaan Sitska.

References

1883 births
1957 deaths
Members of the Estonian Constituent Assembly